Christos Davatzikos is the Wallace T. Miller Sr. Professor of Radiology at the University of Pennsylvania was named Fellow of the Institute of Electrical and Electronics Engineers (IEEE) in 2014 for contributions to automatic analysis and interpretation of biomedical multi-dimensional data.

References

Fellow Members of the IEEE
Living people
University of Pennsylvania faculty
21st-century American engineers
Greek engineers
Johns Hopkins University alumni
National Technical University of Athens alumni
Year of birth missing (living people)
American electrical engineers